The 1960 International Cross Country Championships was held in Hamilton, Scotland, at the Hamilton Park on 26 March 1960. A report on the event was given in the Glasgow Herald.

Complete results, medallists, 
 and the results of British athletes were published.

Medallists

Individual Race Results

Men's (9 mi / 14.5 km)

Team Results

Men's

Participation
An unofficial count yields the participation of 71 athletes from 8 countries.

 (9)
 (9)
 (9)
 (9)
 (9)
 (9)
 (8)
 (9)

See also
 1960 in athletics (track and field)

References

International Cross Country Championships
International Cross Country Championships
Cross
International Cross Country Championships
International Cross Country Championships
Cross country running in the United Kingdom
Hamilton, South Lanarkshire
Sport in South Lanarkshire
20th century in South Lanarkshire